Local elections were held in Iran on 19 May 2017 to elect members of the City and Village Councils simultaneously with the twelfth presidential election.

Registration
A total number of 287,425 candidates registered in the elections nationwide, including 17,885 women (6.3%). Share of female candidates shows a slight increase in comparison to 2013 elections, when they made up just 5.4%.

Results

Provincial capitals 

KhabarOnline reported the results for ten major city councils as follows:

Rouhani administration-controlled newspaper Iran and allegedly Revolutionary Guards-affiliated Tasnim News Agency published detailed reports on the results, with the number of seats won by each bloc as following:

See also List of results of 2017 Iranian local elections based on provinces for more detailed results.

Highlights 
During the elections, a 60-year-old bird seller was placed first in Khorram Abad, campaigning with walking the streets introducing himself to people. In Rasht, a teacher who was sacked after the 1979 Iranian Revolution as well as a street sweeper were elected.

Post-election controversy over non-Muslim councillors 
There has been a controversy around the reelection of Sepanta Niknam, a Zoroastrian municipal councillor in Yazd, as there was no clear legislation on the matter. "On April 15, about one month before Iran’s local and presidential elections", Ahmad Jannati, head of the Guardian Council, had "issued a directive demanding that non-Muslims be disqualified from running in the then-upcoming city and village council elections in localities where most of the population are Muslims". On November 26, 2017, Iranian lawmakers approved the urgency of a bill that would give the right for members of the religious minorities to nominate candidates for the city and village councils elections. The bill secured 154 yes votes, 23 no and 10 abstention. A total of 204 lawmakers were present at the parliament session.

References

2017
local elections
May 2017 events in Iran